Lacunoides vitreus is a species of sea snail, a marine gastropod mollusk in the family Neomphalidae.

Description

Distribution

References

Neomphalidae
Gastropods described in 2001